Vinson may refer to:

Places
 Vinson, Oklahoma, a community in the US
 Vinson Massif, the highest mountain in Antarctica

People
 Vinson (surname), people with the surname Vinson
 Vinson Filyaw (1969–2021), construction worker convicted of kidnapping and raping
 Vinson political family

Other uses
 VINSON, a family of voice encryption devices
 Vinson, a fictional member of the Stanfield Organization, on The Wire
 USS Carl Vinson (CVN-70), a US Navy Nimitz-class supercarrier
 Vinson & Elkins, an American law firm

See also
 Vincent (disambiguation)